Maxime Le Guil is a French recording engineer, mixer and record producer.

He has produced, mixed or engineered records for Morrissey, Hans Zimmer, Melody Gardot, SoKo, Justice, Melody's Echos Chamber, Camille, Christine And The Queens, Hyphen Hyphen, CocoRosie, Gregory Porter, Lianne La Havas, Vanessa Paradis, Christophe, JoeyStarr, Jean Louis Murat and many others.

He has worked with Nigel Godrich on Radiohead's 2016 Album, A Moon Shaped Pool

In 2016, he was nominated for a Grammy Award for Best Engineered Album, Non-Classical for his work on Currency of Man by Melody Gardot.

Partial Discography 

 Melody Gardot - Currency of Man
 Hans Zimmer - The Little Prince
 Hyphen Hyphen - HH
 Christine and the Queens - iTunes Session – EP
 Melody’s Echo Chamber - Cross My Heart
 Radiohead - A Moon Shaped Pool - Assistant engineering 
 Justice - Woman
 Her - Her
 Camille - Ouï
 Her - Tape #2
 Guillaume Gallienne - Maryline
 Camille - Ilo Veyou
 SoKo - My Dreams Dictate My Reality
 Morrissey - Low in High School
 Christophe - Les Vestiges Du Chaos
 Vincent Delerm - À Présent
 Night Riots - Love Gloom
 Cascadeur - Camera
 Morrissey - World Peace Is None Of Your Business
 Rosemary Standley and Dom La Nena - Birds On A Wire
 Christophe - Intime
 Vincent Delerm - Les Amants Parallèles
 Kyrie Kristmanson - Modern Ruin
 Round Nina - A Tribute To Nina Simone
 L - Chansons
 Teleskopes - Lazers
 Joeystarr - Egomaniac
 Concrete Knives - Be Your Own King
 Pi Ja Ma - Radio Girl – EP
 Tribute - Autour De Chet
 Mika - The Origin Of Love
 Jean Louis Murat - Grand Lièvre
 Archipel - Rowing Jewel
 SoKo - I Thought I Was An Alien

References 

French audio engineers
Living people
Year of birth missing (living people)
Place of birth missing (living people)